Norman and Dawbarn (styled Norman & Dawbarn, and later, Norman + Dawbarn) was a British architectural and engineering practice, established in 1934.

History
The practice was formed by Graham Dawbarn and Nigel Norman in 1934. The practice was preceded by Norman, Muntz & Dawbarn, formed with Alan Muntz.

In 2005 the practice was acquired by Capita Symonds following the collapse into administration. It traded as a subsidiary Capita Norman + Dawbarn until it was merged into Capita Architecture in 2007, though the name continues to be used in some international markets.

Notable projects
 BBC Television Centre – Designed 1949, built 1953 to 1960
 University of Malta campus, Msida, Malta – Designed 1961, built 1964 to 1970
Budhanilkantha School, Nepal – Completion 1973

Notable staff

 Bill Bradfield
 Gertrude Leverkus
 Michael Manser

References

Architecture firms of England
Design companies established in 1934
1934 establishments in England